Əmirzeydli (also, Əmirzeyidli and Amirzeitli) is a village and municipality in the Beylagan Rayon of Azerbaijan.  It has a population of 887.

References 

Populated places in Beylagan District